Charlevoix station is a Montreal Metro station in the borough of Le Sud-Ouest in Montreal, Quebec, Canada. It is operated by the Société de transport de Montréal (STM) and serves the Green Line. It is located in the district of Pointe-Saint-Charles. It opened on September 3, 1978, as part of the extension of the Green Line westward to Angrignon station.

Architecture and art 
Designed by Ayotte et Bergeron, it was built as a stacked platform station, in order to reduce the width of the station owing to the weak Utica Shale in which it was built.

The station has one ticket hall and one access. The long stairways to the platforms, built around a light shaft, are brightened by two stained-glass windows by Mario Merola and Pierre Osterrath.

Origin of the name
This station is named for rue Charlevoix. Pierre François Xavier de Charlevoix (1682–1761) was a French Jesuit historian and explorer of New France.

Connecting bus routes

Nearby points of interest
 Centre Saint-Charles
 St. Columba House
 Clinique communautaire de Pointe-Saint-Charles
 Carrefour d'éducation publique
 Parc du Canal-de-Lachine
 Maison Saint-Gabriel

References

External links

 Charlevoix Station - official site
 Montreal by Metro, metrodemontreal.com - photos, information, and trivia
 2016 STM System Map
 2016 Downtown System Map
 Metro Map

Green Line (Montreal Metro)
Le Sud-Ouest
Railway stations in Canada opened in 1978